6RPH Vision Australia Radio  broadcasts on 990 kHz AM and was previously owned and operated by the Foundation for Information Radio of Western Australia Inc. It now broadcasts Vision Australia Radio and aims to provide access to printed information for Western Australians with a print disability. Vision Australia Radio is a member of RPH Australia.

Its radio reading service is available on 990 AM throughout the wider Perth metropolitan area. However, in the early part of 2015 the station started to play a recorded music loop, together with a repeated announcement that its service had been suspended due to "technical issues". In March/early April 2015, 6RPH ceased broadcasting, but has since recommenced transmission with the Vision Australia Radio service on 990AM and on IRIS digital.

Radio 6PM occupied the 990 kHz frequency until the late 1980s.

See also	
 List of radio stations in Australia
 Radio Print Handicapped Network

References

External links
  6RPH on Information Radio

Radio stations in Perth, Western Australia
Radio reading services of Australia